East Zone of Bangladesh Railway is a zone of Railway of Bangladesh.

References

Bangladesh Railway